Aza Alibekovna Takho-Godi (born 26 October 1922, in Makhachkala, Dagestan) is a Soviet and Russian philologist.   
She was married to philosopher and philologist Aleksei Losev, whom she met in 1945.

Takho-Godi graduated from the Philological Faculty of Moscow State Pedagogical University in 1944. She defended her dissertation, titled «Поэтические тропы Гомера и их социальный смысл», at Lomonosov Moscow State University. She lectured at Taras Shevchenko National University of Kyiv from 1948 to 1949, then worked as an associate professor at Moscow State Pedagogical University from 1949 to 1957. In 1959 she defended her doctoral dissertation at the Gorky Institute of World Literature. Her thesis was called «Античность и русские революционные демократы в связи с предшествующей им лит.-эстетической традицией». In 1965, she received the title of Professor.

Takho-Godi turned 100 in October 2022, for which she was awarded the Order of Equal-to-the-Apostles Princess Olga by Patriarch Kirill of Moscow.

Recognition
 Doktor Nauk in Philosophical Sciences (1959)
 Professor of Lomonosov Moscow State University (1965)
 Honoured Professor of Lomonosov Moscow State University (1992)
 Honoured Scientist of the Russian Federation (1998)
 Honoured Scientist of Dagestan (2012)
 Order of Equal-to-the-Apostles Princess Olga, First Degree (2022)

References

Living people
1922 births
Honoured Scientists of the Russian Federation
Soviet philologists
Russian philologists
Academic staff of Moscow State University
Women philologists
Russian centenarians
Women centenarians